Galaksija is Serbian, Croatian, Bosnian, Slovenian,  and Montenegrin word for galaxy. It may refer to:

 Galaksija (magazine), a magazine published since 1972 to 1990s
 Galaksija (computer), a 1983 home computer

sr:Галаксија (вишезначна одредница)